Gateway is a census-designated place (CDP) in Lee County, Florida, United States. The population was 8,401 at the 2010 United States Census. It is part of the Cape Coral-Fort Myers, Florida Metropolitan Statistical Area. The community is located north of Southwest Florida International Airport.

Geography

Demographics

As of the 2010 United States Census, there were 8,401 people living in the CDP. The racial makeup of the CDP was 87.6% White, 9.3% Black, 2.0% Asian, and 0.9% from two or more races. Hispanic or Latino of any race were 9.5% of the population.

The median income for a household in the CDP was $83,583 and the per capita income for the CDP was $37,682. About 6.1% of the population were below the poverty line.

Education
Gateway Charter High School
Gateway Elementary and Intermediate Charter School K-8

References

Census-designated places in Lee County, Florida
Census-designated places in Florida
Planned communities in Florida